Scott Watson (born 1950) is a Canadian curator, writer, and researcher based in Vancouver, British Columbia. Watson was the Director/Curator of the Morris and Helen Belkin Art Gallery at the University of British Columbia from 1995 to 2021. As faculty in the Department of Art History, Visual Art and Theory at the University of British Columbia, he helped initiate the Critical Curatorial Studies program at UBC in September 2002. Through his research and publications, he has acted as a champion of contemporary Vancouver artists.

Career 
Watson was trained in art history and received his BA and MA at UBC. He was initially a fiction writer and published two books, "Stories" (1974) and "Platonic Love" (1981). In 1980, he was hired by the Vancouver Art Gallery. In 1985, he curated the Young Romantics painting exhibition and in 1990, published a monograph on Jack Shadbolt. In 1989, he was hired by the University of British Columbia (UBC) gallery. In 1995, he became the first director/curator of the gallery. He retired in 2021.

Curatorial Projects and Research 
Watson's research and curation focuses primarily around topics related to contemporary art, art theory and criticism, twentieth-century art history, and curatorial studies. His curatorial projects have appeared across Canada including at the Vancouver Art Gallery, Morris and Helen Belkin Art Gallery, and Artspeak in Vancouver and internationally in Berlin, Antwerp, and London.

Notable curatorial projects 
 Queer Landscapes (1991) at Artspeak
 Thrown: Influences and Intentions (2004) of West Coast Ceramics
 Rebecca Belmore: Fountain (2005) for the Venice Biennale Canadian Pavilion
 Intertidal: Vancouver art & artists (2005-2006) at the Museum of Contemporary Art in Antwerp
 Stan Douglas: Inconsolable Memories (2005-2006) at the Tate Modern
 Exponential Future (2008) at the Morris and Helen Belkin Art Gallery
 Jack Shadbolt: Underpinnings (2009) at the Morris and Helen Belkin Art Gallery
 Mark Boulos (2010), a solo exhibition at the Morris and Helen Belkin Art Gallery
 Letters: Michael Morris and Concrete Poetry (2012) at the Morris and Helen Belkin Art Gallery
 Image Bank (2019) at the KW Institute for Contemporary Arts

Selected publications 
 </ref>

Awards and honours 
 an invitation to the UBC Chancellor's Circle (2005).
 UBC Dorothy Somerset Award for Performance Development in the Visual and Performing Arts (2005)
 Alvin Balkind Award for Creative Curatorship in British Columbia Arts (2008) 
 Hnatyshyn Foundation Award for Curatorial Excellence in Contemporary Art (2010)

References

Living people
1950 births
Canadian art curators
Academic staff of the University of British Columbia
20th-century Canadian male writers
20th-century Canadian non-fiction writers
21st-century Canadian male writers
21st-century Canadian non-fiction writers
Canadian male non-fiction writers